Vietri sul Mare ("Vietri on the Sea";) is a town and comune in the province of Salerno, in the Campania region of southern Italy.  It is situated just west of Salerno, separated from the Port of Salerno by only a harbour wall. The town is known for its polychrome ceramics, a tradition since at least the 15th century, and is considered to be the gateway to the Amalfi Coast. 

The main landmark is the Church of St. John the Baptist, a late Neapolitan Renaissance style building with a high bell tower. There are numerous buildings displaying ceramics, including the Museo Provinciale della Ceramica in the nearby village of Raito.

Geography
The town is bordered by Cava de' Tirreni, Cetara, Maiori and Salerno. The quarter by the sea, named Marina di Vietri is located to the south of the town. The other hamlets are Albori, Benincasa, Dragonea (including the localities of Iaconti and San Vincenzo) and Molina.

Main sights

The principal church in Vietri sul Mare is the Church of St. John the Baptist, a late Neapolitan Renaissance style building with a high bell tower. A previous church dated from the 10th century. It contains a coffered gold ceiling, a 17th-century marble altar, an alabaster statue of the Saint, and an 11th-century wooden crucifix. The Confraternity of the Annunciation and the Rosary dates to the 17th century and is noted for its facade decorated with pottery. Other notable churches include the 16th century Church of the Madonna delle Grazie in Raito, the Church of Santa Margherita in Albori and the Church of Santa Maria delle Grazie in Benincasa.

The Palazzo Solimene was built after World War II by Paolo Soleri, and houses ceramic collections. The Palazzo Taiani is noted for its dovecote tower, which was once used to watch out for Saracens during raids. The nearby village of Raito contains the Museo Provinciale della Ceramica.

Notable people
Antonio Carluccio, chef
Massimo D'Amico, artist
Antonio Forcellino, historian
Antonio Savastano, opera singer
Germano Benencase (Benincasa), composer, musician and conductor
Giuseppe Prezzolini, writer, honoured citizen

References

External links

 Vietri sul Mare at Amalfiguide.it

Cities and towns in Campania
Amalfi Coast